Mr. Egypt is a national male beauty pageant held annually in Egypt. Major competitive areas are charisma, fitness, good looks and personality. The contest is sponsored by Oriflame Men and is held under the auspices of Egypt's Ministry of Tourism.

Seasons

Mr Egypt 2006
24-year-old Ibrahim Abdel Gawad was crowned Mr Egypt in 2006. He was unable to compete at Mister World 2007 in Sanya, China due to his father's health problems so the fifth runner-up, Omar Emad, was sent as a replacement.

Mr Egypt 2007
Amr Samaha was crowned in April 2007 as Mr. Egypt. At 19, Samaha was the youngest contestant. He is a private pilot in flight school. In addition, he is a mechanical engineering student at the American University in Cairo, Egypt. Samaha represented Egypt at Mister International in Malaysia. The first runner-up Tarek Naguib was sent on to compete at Manhunt International 2008 and at Mister World 2010 in Incheon, South Korea.

1st Runner-Up: Tarek Naguib
2nd Runner-Up: Amr Salem
3rd Runner-Up: Mohamed El-Khouly
4th Runner-Up: Karim Gamal El-Din

Mr Egypt 2010
After representing Egypt at Mister World, Tarek Mohammed Nagiub Abdel Gawad was named Mr. Egypt in 2010.

Titleholders

See also
Miss Egypt
Mister World
Manhunt International
Mister International

References

Egypt
Beauty pageants in Egypt
Egyptian awards